Bend to the Breaks is the debut album by Five O'Clock Heroes. It was released on September 18, 2006 on CD and as a digital download.

Track listing
"Head Games" – 2:50
"Anybody Home" – 3:19
"Time On My Hands" – 3:11
"Run to Her" – 3:32
"Number Again" – 3:24
"Knocked Her Up" (US exclusive) – 3:16
"Good Lovers" – 3:47
"Skin Deep" – 2:55
"Corporate Boys" – 4:03
"Stay the Night" – 2:48
"White Girls" – 3:19
"In Control" – 2:45
"Turn It Up" – 2:20
"Give It Up" – 2:47

2006 debut albums
Five O'Clock Heroes albums